Mylothris mavunda is a butterfly in the family Pieridae. It is found in north-western Zambia. The habitat consists of Cryptosepalum forests.

Adults have been recorded on wing in March, April, May, November and December.

References

Butterflies described in 1985
Pierini
Endemic fauna of Zambia
Butterflies of Africa